The 2014–15 Sevens World Series, known for sponsorship reasons as the HSBC Sevens World Series, was the 16th annual series of rugby sevens tournaments for national rugby sevens teams. The Sevens World Series has been run by World Rugby since 1999–2000. This series also, for the first time, doubled as a qualifier for the 2016 Summer Olympics, with the top four countries qualifying automatically.

Itinerary
The schedule for the 2014–15 Series was released to the public in early March 2014.

Core teams
For each season, 15 core teams receive guaranteed berths in all events for that season's series. Fourteen of these teams qualified via their placement in the 2013–14 series. In addition to the previous season's top 14, Japan joined the core teams as they were the winners of the qualifying tournament during the 2014 Hong Kong Sevens. Spain, being the last placed core team for 2013–14, were relegated and lost their status as a core team for the 2014–15 season.

Standings

Source: World Rugby  

{| class="wikitable" style="font-size:92%;"
|-
!colspan=2| Legend
|- style="line-height:18px; font-size:90%;"
|colspan=2 align=center |Qualification for the 2015–16 World Sevens Series
|-
|No colour
|Core team in 2014–15 and re-qualified as a core team for the 2015–16 World Rugby Sevens Series
|-
|bgcolor=#fcc|Pink
|Relegated as the lowest placed core team at the end of the 2014–15 season
|-
|bgcolor=#ffc|Yellow
|Not a core team
|- style="line-height:18px; font-size:90%;"
|colspan=2 align=center |Qualification for the 2016 Olympic Sevens
|-
|colspan=2 style="border-left:3px solid #06f;"| Qualified as one of the four highest placed eligible teams from the 2014–15 World Rugby Sevens Series not already qualified.
|-
|colspan=2 style="border-left:3px solid #7cf;"| Already confirmed for 2016 (host country Brazil)
|}

Tournaments

Gold Coast

Dubai

Port Elizabeth

Wellington

Las Vegas

Hong Kong

Tokyo

Glasgow

London

Player scoring

Updated: 5 June 2015

Updated: 5 June 2015

References

External links
Official Site

 
World Rugby Sevens Series